The 16th Vietnam Film Festival was held from December 14 to December 17, 2009 in Tuy Hòa City, Phú Yên Province, Vietnam, with the slogan "For a reformed and integrated Vietnam cinema" (Vietnamese: "Vì một nền điện ảnh Việt Nam đổi mới và hội nhập").

Event 
The 17th Vietnam Film Festival is one of the special cultural activities, responding to the National Tourism Year of the South Central Coast - Phú Yên 2011. It is an interesting coincidence that the 17th Vietnam Film Festival has exactly 17 feature films participating in the competition. In addition, the closing ceremony of the film festival also took place on December 17, 2011.

This year, no feature films were awarded gold. The jury awarded 4 Golden Lotuses for each category: Documentary Feature, Direct-to-video Documentary, Science film and Animated film.

Participation 
Eligible films for the award are films released after the 16th Vietnam Film Festival until the deadline for the Organizing Committee to receive the registration form and attached documents is October 20. The deadline to receive films is from November 1 to 15.

The 17th Vietnam Film Festival attracted the participation of 108 films from 30 film establishments nationwide, including 17 feature films, 5 direct-to-video feature films, 10 documentary feature films, 52 direct-to-video documentary, 8 science films and 16 animated films.

Jury 
In addition to the usual awards, at this festival, the award "Best Sound Design" was brought back but there will be no film award voted by the audience. The Film Festival will have only 3 Jury Panels (feature films, documentary - science and animated) instead 4 as before, each with at least 7 members. The feature film segment will be led by Director Lưu Trọng Ninh as Head of the Jury; Director Bùi Đình Hạc is the Head of the Jury for the Documentary - Science category and director Vũ Kim Dũng is the Head of the Animation Jury.

The jury team has also "makeover" and "rejuvenated" to the maximum. That more or less helps the public to be reassured by the proximity of contemporary Vietnamese cinema to the world, and at the same time affirms the innovative wind of national cinema.

Activities 
All films participating in the 17th Vietnamese Film Festival will be screened from December 12, 2011 to December 17, 2011 at 4 locations: Hưng Đạo Cinema, Diên Hồng Cultural Center, Nha Trang Cinema Labor Culture, Multi-Language Department (under Thuan Thao Joint Stock Company). This is an opportunity for the public to approach and directly evaluate the films participating in the Festival. In addition, the Organizing Committee and the locality will organize outdoor movie screening spots at the April 1st Square so that the audience has the opportunity to enjoy the spectacular films that have been staged so far, meeting the movie viewing needs of a large number of people. audience and "warm up" the atmosphere during the Film Festival.

Within the framework of the festival, in addition to general activities such as opening, closing and awarding ceremonies, there are also various activities such as:
Seminar "Vietnamese Cinema - Current situation and solutions" (Vietnamese: "Điện ảnh Việt Nam thực trạng và giải pháp")
Seminar "Sharing on cinema development policy" (Vietnamese: "Chia sẻ về chính sách phát triển điện ảnh") with the participation of speakers Simon Christopher, policy maker of European cinema development and Ms. Kim Jung Ah, General Director in charge of Cinema, CJ Media Group (South Korea)
An exhibition with the theme "Four Decades of Vietnam Film Festival"
The event "Cinema artists do charity" for people with meritorious services to the revolution, the poor, disabled children
Incense offering ceremony at Uncle Hồ's pavilion and Nhạn Mountain Martyrs' Monument
Visiting to Phú Yên scenic spots to promote tourism
Exchanges between artists and soldiers of the Airborne Regiment 910, students of Phú Yên University, audiences and ethnic minorities in Hai Riêng town, Sông Hinh district.

The opening ceremony took place at 8 pm on December 15 at Sao Mai Theater, Tuy Hòa city, Phú Yên province and was broadcast live on VTV2 channel of Vietnam Television. Leaving the most emotions in the opening night was the part honoring generations of actors through four periods of Vietnamese cinema. More than 3,000 spectators present in the hall of Sao Mai Theater as well as television viewers were able to look back at the faces of artists who have made great contributions to the country's cinema from the first days until today.

The closing ceremony and awarding ceremony took place at 8 pm on December 17 and was broadcast live on VTV1 channel.

Inadequacy 
In the ceremony honoring the artists who made the 40-year history of the Vietnam Film Festival, it seems that the animators still occupy a too modest position. Not many animators were honored, and this number is not enough compared to the fact that many people have worked hard to make Vietnamese animation during the past 40 years. Meanwhile, Phi Thanh Vân and Mai Thu Huyền, two actors who have not contributed much, were honored alongside other veteran names of the film industry, making the public and the press react.

The glitches in the awards night, from movies or individuals who are not nominated and still receive the award, or there is only one general introduction clip playing for all the nominations. The clip was even used to illustrate the singer's performance, causing an offensive feeling. For example, when the singer sings a song about love on stage on stage, the image shown on the 5 large LED screens behind is a scene from a revolutionary war movie with a shooting scene.

In addition, the poor joke from two MCs Huy Khánh and Hồng Ánh has left undue bad impressions on the film festival.

Official Selection

Feature film 

Highlighted title indicates Golden Lotus winner but no winner declared this year.

Awards

Feature film

Direct-to-video

Documentary/Science film

Documentary film

Direct-to-Video

Science film

Animated film

References 

Vietnam Film Festival
Vietnam Film Festival
Vietnam Film Festival
2011 in Vietnam